Power of the Dollar is the unreleased debut studio album by American rapper 50 Cent. Originally set to be released as his major-label debut in 2000 by Columbia Records, the album's release was cancelled after Columbia discovered that 50 Cent was struck by nine bullets in a shooting that took place two months before the album was set to release. After the shooting, Columbia dropped 50 Cent from the label. Subsequently, the album was heavily bootlegged. , Columbia has no plans to release the album.

The album features guest appearances from Destiny's Child, Noreaga, Dave Hollister, Bun B and the Madd Rapper. The album's production was handled by Trackmasters, Red Spyda, Sha Self, DJ Scratch and Erick Sermon, among other producers.

Reception

AllMusic writes that the tracks utilize "penetrating wit and funk-infused beats, accompanied by grand orchestrations of commanding horns, pronounced percussion, and various string elements".

Singles
The album's lead single, "How to Rob", was released on August 10, 1999, and was also included on the soundtrack to the film In Too Deep. The single attracted significant controversy due to its content, which was him comically telling how he would rob several high-profile hip-hop & R&B artists. The second single, "Thug Love" featuring Destiny's Child, was released on September 21, 1999. Days before 50 Cent was scheduled to film its music video, he was attacked by a gunman in the infamous shooting incident that left him with nine gunshot wounds and gave him his dimple scar; an event that 50 Cent often references in his lyrics. While hospitalized, he signed a publishing deal with Columbia Records; however, he was dropped from the label after it was discovered that he had been shot. The track, "Ghetto Qur'an (Forgive Me)", has been speculated to be the reason for the shooting.

The third and final single, "Your Life's on the Line", was released in 1999. The song was produced by Terrence Dudley, and was perceived as a diss song to Ja Rule, which would begin their highly publicized feud on records. 50 mocks Ja Rule's catchphrase "Murdaa!", on the chorus of the song, rapping "Murdaa, I don't believe you/Murdaa, Fuck around and leave you/Murdaa, I don't believe you/Murda Murda, your life's on the line". A music video for this song was released, which was also the only song with a music video of the whole album. The song would later be included as a bonus track on 50's officially released debut album Get Rich or Die Tryin'.

Track listing

References

2000 albums
50 Cent albums
Unreleased albums
Albums produced by DJ Scratch
Columbia Records albums
Albums produced by Erick Sermon
Albums produced by Rashad Smith
Albums produced by Trackmasters